Sanchit Balhara and Ankit Balhara are an Indian film score composer duo. Sanchit Balhara started his career as a solo composer and became best known for composing the score of Sanjay Leela Bhansali's 2015 epic historical romance film, Bajirao Mastani. Sanchit's elder brother, Ankit Balhara, joined him in 2018, and the duo have been composing together since Manikarnika: The Queen of Jhansi.

The brothers born in Rohtak, Haryana, India into a family with a music/film background. Their father Bhal Singh Balhara, is a singer, actor and filmmaker in the Haryanvi film industry. His mother Mukta Chaudhary, is a national level athlete.

Sanchit studied classical music in London. He got his big break as a film score composer with Sanjay Leela Bhansali's Bajirao Mastani. His work in Bajirao Mastani was highly appreciated throughout the industry and also won him awards including IIFA, Music Mirchi, GIMA and Zee cine awards.

Education 
Sanchit completed a Music Production & Sound Engineering Diploma at Point Blank Music School in 2011.

As Background Score Composers

Awards and nominations

References

External links

Indian film score composers
Year of birth missing (living people)
Living people